Part of a series of articles on Archaeology of Kosovo

Paldenica is situated around 150 m on the left side of the Pristina-Skopje road, at the entrance of the village of Paldenica, above a hill which lays west from the village, on a terrain configuration of a shape of a horse, that has a broader overview of wider area of Lepenc gorge and the town of Hani i Elezit, an amount of surface visible remains of Roman pottery and bricks/tiles has been recorded in the past. Nevertheless, in 1967, at the area situated in the vicinity of the left river shore of Lepenc, couple of meters along the river bank stretched toward the Hani i Elezit, a Roman period necropolis was recorded.

Numerous, movable archaeological material was collected and documented at this reconnaissance occasion, where a bronze cast belt decorated with glass pasta in the millefiori technique was found (a glasswork technique which produces distinctive decorative patterns on glassware). The archaeological material dates chronologically sometime from the 2nd up to 3rd century AD, this a time period of the construction of necropolis of Paldenica. On the other hand, during the agricultural work carried out at the other side located on a hill part in 1995, a marble engraved and inscribed stelae of the Roman date was accidentally discovered (2nd- 3rd century AD). The stele has the following dimensions: 160 X 97 X 17,5 cm. Moreover, in another occasion, two bases for columns were discovered at the same place. Most likely, the site was a Roman date settlement and when considering the surrounding terrain configuration, presumably, if investigated further, traces of a Roman road station might be found somewhere close; it can be assumed since the road that linked ancient Scupi (Skopje) with Ulpiana, have passed through these parts.

See also 
Roman Dardania
Roman cities in Illyria
Archaeology of Kosovo
Roman Period Sites in Kosovo
Neolithic Sites in Kosovo
Copper, Bronze and Iron Age Sites in Kosovo
Late Antiquity and Medieval Sites in Kosovo

References 

Illyrian Kosovo
Archaeology of Illyria
Dardanians
Moesia
Dardania (Roman province)
Roman towns and cities in Kosovo
Archaeological sites in Kosovo